Kinesin-like protein KIFC1 is a protein that in humans is encoded by the KIFC1 gene.

Function 
The protein KifC1 is a member of kinesin-14 family. KifC1 consists of C-terminal motor domain, superhelical stalk and N-terminal tail domain. Tail and motor domains contain microtubule-binding sites. This kinesin moves towards the minus-end of microtubule and has an ability to slide or crosslink microtubules. KifC1 functions during mitotic spindle formation.

References

Further reading

External links